Flavobacterium araucananum  is a Gram-negative and non-spore-forming bacterium from the genus of Flavobacterium which has been isolated from a kidney of an ill salmon (Salmo salar) from a fish farm in Concepción in Chile.

References

 

araucananum
Bacteria described in 2012